Chris Dickson may refer to:

 Chris Dickson (footballer) (born 1984), English-born Ghanaian international footballer
 Chris Dickson (sailor) (born 1961), New Zealand yacht racer

See also
Chris Dixon, American internet entrepreneur and investor
Chris Dixon (American football) (born 1981), indoor football head coach
Chris Dixon, known during  the Rhodesian raid on Westlands Farm as ‘Green Leader’